Northgate Mall is a shopping mall located in the Terra Linda neighborhood of San Rafael, California,  north of the Golden Gate Bridge. It's the largest of three shopping centers in San Rafael called Northgate. It was managed by The Macerich Company until 2017 and is now managed by Merlone Geier Partners. It is the only enclosed regional shopping center in Marin County. The mall's anchors are Macy's and Kohl's with a vacant anchor last occupied by Sears. It also contains a Century Theatres multiplex, a food court, and more than 90 specialty stores, services, and restaurants.

The original anchor in the corner, now occupied by Macy's, was The Emporium, which opened in 1964. When the rest of the mall opened in 1965, it had an open-air design. The mall was enclosed when it was renovated in 1987.

MTR Properties, Inc. was the original owner of the mall. Macerich bought the property in 1985 before selling it to Merlone Geier Partners in 2017.

On January 4, 2018, Sears announced that its store at the mall will be closing as part of a plan to close 103 stores nationwide. The store closed in April 2018. Around the same time, plans were announced that would transform the mall into a "town center." 

On November 14, 2019, Forever 21 announced that the Northgate Mall location would be closing along with 21 other locations in California and 90 locations nationwide. It closed in January 2020.

Renovation

Macerich began renovating the mall in 2008. The proposed renovation has been controversial, as housing advocates have pushed for inclusion of affordable housing in the project (to replace the aging housing in San Rafael's Canal Area), while Macerich chose to proceed without triggering a full-scale environmental review.

In November of 2009, Northgate underwent a significant overhaul that introduced features that seamlessly integrate indoor and outdoor spaces. These include the Oak Plaza, a central courtyard for gatherings, open-air dining areas, and a food court near the Century Theatres that opens to both indoor and outdoor seating.

Redevelopment Project 
In March of 2021, Merlone Geier Partners submitted a two-phase redevelopment project to the City of San Rafael. The first phase is proposed to begin in 2025, with demolition of the center portion of the mall, the former Sears anchor store, and the HomeGoods store across the east entrance from the mall. The HomeGoods will be relocated to another part of the property. The first phase also includes a remodel and expansion of the existing cinema to a total of 65,000 square feet. The cinema will include an IMAX theater. 

In addition to the demolition and remodel projects, the first phase includes the construction of four new apartment buildings on the southeast side of the property, totaling 896 residences. One building is proposed to be four stories, while the others are proposed to be five stories. The apartment buildings will have retail spaces at the ground level, and new retail spaces are expected to be constructed across Las Gallinas Avenue. 

The second phase of the project is proposed to begin in 2028, beginning with the demolition of existing mall commercial space. The demolition includes the existing Macy's and Kohl's stores, should they not renew their leases with the property. The second phase also includes the construction of two five-story apartment buildings, totaling 640 residences.

After both phases, the mall is expected to retain approximately 250,000 square feet of its original floor area. Parking is expected to reduce from the current 2,908 spaces to 2,311 spaces.

Gallery

References

External links 

 

Shopping malls in Marin County, California
Shopping malls in the San Francisco Bay Area
Buildings and structures in San Rafael, California
Shopping malls established in 1966
1966 establishments in California